The 1981–82 FIS Ski Jumping World Cup was the third World Cup season in ski jumping. It began in Cortina d'Ampezzo, Italy on 20 December 1981 and finished in Planica, Yugoslavia on 28 March 1982. The individual World Cup was won by Armin Kogler and Nations Cup by Austria.

Map of world cup hosts 
All 14 locations which have been hosting world cup events for men this season. Events in St. Nizier were completely canceled.

 Four Hills Tournament
 Swiss Tournament
 World Cup & Nordic World Championships
 KOP International Ski Flying Week

Calendar

Men

Standings

Overall

Nations Cup

Four Hills Tournament

References 

World cup
World cup
FIS Ski Jumping World Cup